Sulujeh (also Romanized as Sūlūjeh and Soolloojeh; also known as Sūlījeh, Sūlojā, Suludzha, and Suluja) is a village in Mavazekhan-e Sharqi Rural District, Khvajeh District, Heris County, East Azerbaijan Province, Iran. At the 2006 census, its population was 76, in 23 families.

References 

Populated places in Heris County